Bad Ems is a station in the town of  Bad Ems in the German state of Rhineland-Palatinate. It is on the Lahntal railway (Koblenz–Wetzlar). The entrance building is heritage-listed.

Construction

The station has an entrance hall, an extension formerly used as a Fürstenbahnhof ("Princes' station", that it was built to be used by royalty) and a train shed built by MAN in 1910; which is the smallest train shed in the DB network. It was built because of the great importance of Bad Ems as a spa before the First World War. The ensemble is given heritage protection as a cultural monument.

A pedestrian subway, which was built later, connects the entrance building with the island platform and Braubacher Straße (L 327) on the other side of the station. The entrance is equipped with a wheelchair ramp. An extension to the station building contains remains of paintings on the ceiling. This contains stairs and a lift connecting with the subway to the platform and to Braubacher Straße.

In the meantime the station was classified as a Haltepunkt (halt). Station points were installed and the signals were renewed in August 2015 to allow more trains to pass over the Lahntal railway during the busiest periods. The installation of points meant that it was reclassified from a halt to a station.

Tracks

The station has a platform with two platform tracks:

 track 1 (length: 277 metre; height: 34/55 cm): trains to Koblenz Hauptbahnhof
 track 2 (length: 272 metre; height: 34/55 cm): trains to Limburg (Lahn) and Gießen

Connections

Trains

The following services stop in Bad Ems station:

Buses 

The following bus routes stop at the nearest bus stop, called Bad Ems Hauptbahnhof:
 456: Bad Ems–Welschneudorf–Montabaur
 547: Bad Ems town route
 557: Bad Ems–Arzbach–Neuhäusel(–Koblenz)

References

Railway stations in Rhineland-Palatinate
Railway stations in Germany opened in 1858
Rhein-Lahn-Kreis